Bailando 2011 was the seventh Argentinean season of Bailando por un Sueño. The season premiere aired on May 16, 2011 on El Trece with 30 couples, including same-sex pairs for the first time in the Argentinean show– José María Muscari in the male couple; in the female couple, initially Silvina and Vanina Escudero, then Silvina Escudero and Sofía Pachano– and, for the first time in the world, a contestant with dwarfism: Noelia Pompa, a singer.
The premiere featured special appearances by Mariano Martinez, Carolina "Pampita" Ardohaín, Ariel "El Burrito" Ortega, Alberto Cormillot 
(the physician of ), and Griselda Siciliani, who performed dance routines during the show's opening. The competition began on May 17 and featured a special guest, the Brazilian footballer Ronaldinho. The premiere drew a 37.1% rating, smashing the competition.
As in previous seasons the cast also included international celebrities: Pamela Anderson, Mike Tyson and Larissa Riquelme.

The jury initially consisted of Graciela Alfano, Flavio Mendoza, Moria Casán, Anibal Pachano, and Carmen Barbieri. 
In weeks 3, 5, and 6 Carmen was replaced by Marcelo Polino, but she returned following the departure of Graciela Alfano. Later Graciela came back to replace Carmen in Rotating room and Music from the Movies round.

The winner was revealed on the season finale, on December 22, 2011:  singer Noelia Pompa, paired with professional classic dancer Hernán Piquín, with 52.59% of the public vote.

Couples 

Source:

 Mike Tyson left the competition, and Jorge "Negrito" Luengo entered in his place.
 Pamela Anderson left the competition, and Paula Chaves entered in her place.
 Wanda Nara left the competition, and Zaira Nara entered in her place.
 Rocío Guirao Díaz left the competition, and Carolina "Pampita" Ardohaín entered in her place.
 Carolina "Pampita" Ardohaín left the competition, and Evangelina Anderson entered in her place.
 Vanina Escudero left the competition, and Sofía Pachano entered in her place.
 Franco Tabernero was the original partner, but he left the competition after Disco's round.
 Juan Pablo Battaglia was the original partner, but he left the competition after Strip dance's round.

Scoring chart 

Red numbers indicate the lowest score for each week.
Green numbers indicate the highest score for each week.
 indicates the couple eliminated that week.
 indicates the couple was saved by the public.
 indicates the couple was saved by the jury.
 indicates the couple withdrew.
 indicates the winning couple.
 indicates the runner-up couple.
 indicates the semifinalists couples.

In the second duel Larissa Riquelme was replaced by Andrea Ghidone and Pamela Anderson by Virginia Gallardo.
In the ninth duel Denise Dumas was replaced by Sofía Zámolo.
Pamela Anderson & Damian Whitewood withdrew the competition in Round 4. As they were sentenced, the new permanent couple that was replacing them (Paula Chaves & Pablo Juín) was saved by the judges.
From the round 11 Vanina Escudero was replaced by Sofía Pachano.
In round 22, all the teams danced Acrobatic Salsa as they were in a sentence, so there were no scores. The safe couples, were the semifinalists
 replaced by Andrea Ghidone.
 replaced by Claudia Ciardone.
 replaced by Manuel Navarrete.
 replaced by Belén Francese.
 replaced by Naim "Turco" Sibara.
 Silvina was replaced by Álvaro "Waldo" Navia.
 replaced by Virginia Gallardo.
 Noelia was replaced by Marcela Feudale.

Highest and lowest scoring performances 
The best and worst performances in each dance according to the judges' marks are as follows:

Styles, scores and songs
Secret vote is in bold text.

May

June

July

August

September

October

November

December

Duel

Semifinal and Final

 replaced by Hugo Ávila.
 replaced by Marcelo Polino.
 replaced by Laura Fidalgo.
 replaced by Reina Reech.
 replaced by Carmen Barbieri.
 replaced by Graciela Alfano.

References

External links
  Canal 13's Showmatch website

Argentina
Argentine variety television shows
2011 Argentine television seasons